The 1935 Christchurch City mayoral election was held on 8 May. The incumbent, Dan Sullivan of the Labour Party narrowly beat the conservative candidate, Hugh Acland, a surgeon and World War I veteran. The election attracted nationwide attention, as Christchurch was a Labour-stronghold and due to Acland's widespread popularity, it was regarded as a test whether Labour could potentially win the November 1935 general election.

Background
In 1935, the voting system returned to the initially used first-past-the-post after a ranked voting system had been tried for some years. The country experienced the Great Depression at the time, with high unemployment. Sullivan had been the city's mayor since 1931, when he beat William Hayward.

Candidates
Dan Sullivan
Dan Sullivan was first elected to Christchurch City Council in 1915. Since then, Sullivan had been representing the  electorate. Sullivan stood for mayor in 1923 but was beaten by James Arthur Flesher. A Labour Party politician, he was regarded as a moderate.

Hugh Acland
Sir Hugh Acland was from a prominent Canterbury family. The youngest of John Acland's 11 children, he was a grandson of Christchurch's first bishop, Henry Harper. John Acland was a member of the Legislative Council for a third of a century. Just prior to the election, the engagement of his son Jack was announced to Kit Ormond; her family was equally prominent in New Zealand, and her grandfather, John Davies Ormond, had been  Superintendent of Hawke's Bay Province. Hugh Acland was a prominent surgeon who served with the New Zealand Medical Corps during World War I. Acland was knighted in the 1933 Birthday Honours for services to medicine. Acland stood in the election for the conservative Citizens' Association.

Campaign
Sullivan's selection for the 1935 mayoralty election was announced on 1 February. John Beanland and Ernest Andrews were rumoured as possible candidates for the Citizens' Association, but Acland's candidacy was announced on 25 February.

Results
Sullivan beat Acland by a small margin, with the election resulting in a record turnout. There were significant differences between the preliminary results released on the evening of the election, and the final results three days later.

Council results

Aftermath
The Labour Party won the November 1935 general election and Sullivan was appointed cabinet minister. Sullivan reluctantly resigned from the mayoralty in February 1936, as the heavy workload of a cabinet minister was incompatible with remaining mayor. The resulting by-election on 11 March 1936 was narrowly won by the deputy-mayor, John Beanland, who represented the Citizens' Association. Beanland beat Labour's candidate, John Archer who had previously been mayor from 1925 to 1931.

Notes

References

Mayoral elections in Christchurch
1935 elections in New Zealand
Politics of Christchurch
1930s in Christchurch